Gunnar Fredrik Hellesen (23 February 1913 –  7 July 2005) was a Norwegian politician for the Conservative Party.

He was born in Haugesund.

He was elected to the Norwegian Parliament from Rogaland in 1961, and was re-elected on one occasion. He had previously served in the position of deputy representative during the term 1958–1961.

On 5 June 1970, he was appointed Minister of Defence during the centre-right cabinet Borten, replacing Otto Grieg Tidemand who on the same day became Minister of Trade and Shipping. Hellesen held the position until the cabinet Borten fell in 1971.

Hellesen was a member of Haugesund city council from 1945 to 1963, serving as mayor in from 1955 to 1959. He served as County Governor of Rogaland from 1968 to 1973.

References

1913 births
2005 deaths
Conservative Party (Norway) politicians
Members of the Storting
Mayors of places in Rogaland
County governors of Norway
People from Haugesund
20th-century Norwegian politicians
Defence ministers of Norway